Yun Geunsu(윤근수, 尹根壽, 1537–1619) was a Korean scholar-official of the Joseon period. Pennames were Woljeong(월정, 月汀), Woeam(외암, 畏菴), courtesy name was Jago(자고, 子固).

Family 
 Grandfather
 Yun Hui-rim (윤희림, 尹希琳)
 Grandmother 
 Lady Park of the Juksan Park clan (죽산 박씨, 竹山朴氏)
 Father 
 Yun Byeon (윤변, 尹忭) (1493 - 8 July 1549) 
 Mother
 Biological - Lady Hyeon of the Palgeo Hyeon clan (팔거현 씨( 八莒 玄氏) (? - 1544); Yun Byeon's second wife
 Grandfather - Hyeon Yun-myeong (현윤명, 玄允明)
 Step - Lady Yi of the Jeonju Yi clan (전주 이씨, 全州 李氏); Yun Byeon's first wife
 Siblings
 Older half-brother - Yun Dam-su (윤담수, 尹聃壽)
 Sister-in-law - Lady Yu of the Jinju Yu clan (진주 유씨, 晋州 柳氏)
 Half-nephew - Yun Hyeon (윤현, 尹晛) (1536 - 1597)
 Older half-brother - Yun Chun-su (윤춘수, 尹春壽) (1521 - ?)
 Sister-in-law - Lady Kim (김씨)
 Half-nephew - Yun Ho (윤호, 尹皞) (1542 - 25 January 1589)
 Older half-brother - Yun Gi-su (윤기수, 尹期壽)
 Older half-sister - Lady Yun of the Haepyeong Yun clan (해평 윤씨)
 Brother-in-law - Jeong Sun-hui (정순희, 鄭純禧)
 Older brother - Yun Doo-su (윤두수, 尹斗壽) (1533 - 1601)
 Sister-in-law - Lady Hwang of the Changwon Hwang clan (창원 황씨, 昌原 黃氏) (? - 1591)
 Nephew - Yun Bang (윤방, 尹昉) (22 June 1563 - August 1640)
 Niece-in-law - Lady Han (한씨)
 Grandnephew - Yun Yi-ji (윤이지, 尹履之)
 Grandnephew - Yun Shin-ji (윤신지, 尹新之) (1582 - 1657)
 Grandniece-in-law - Princess Jeonghye (정혜옹주) (22 March 1582 - 18 November 1638)
 Nephew - Yun Heun (윤흔, 尹昕)(1564 - 17 December 1638)
 Niece-in-law - Lady Yi of the Jeonju Yi clan (전주 이씨) (1565 - 1597)
 Grandnephew - Yun Choi-ji (윤취지, 尹就之) (1583 - 18 February 1644)
 Grandniece - Lady Yun of the Haepyeong Yun clan (해평 윤씨)
 Niece-in-law - Lady Shin of the Yeongsan Shin clan (영산 신씨)
 Niece-in-law - Lady Seo of the Buyeo Seo clan (부여 서씨)
 Grandnephew - Yun Tae-ji (윤태지, 尹泰之)
 Grandniece - Lady Yun of the Haepyeong Yun clan (해평 윤씨)
 Nephew - Yun Hwi (윤휘, 尹暉) (1571 - 1644)
 Niece-in-law - Lady Yi of the Jeonju Yi clan (전주 이씨)
 Grandnephew - Yun Myeon-ji (윤면지, 尹勉之)
 Nephew - Yun Hwon (윤훤, 尹暄) (1573 - 15 February 1627)
 Niece-in-law - Lady Sim of the Cheongsong Sim clan (정부인 청송 심씨)
 Grandnephew - Yun Sun-ji (윤순지, 尹順之)
 Grandnephew - Yun Won-ji (윤원지, 尹元之)
 Grandnephew - Yun Ui-ji (윤의지, 尹誼之)
 Niece-in-law - Lady Lee (이씨, 李氏)
 Grandnephew - Yun Jing-ji (윤징지, 尹澄之)
 Unnamed sister-in-law 
 Nephew - Yun Oh (윤오, 尹旿)
Nephew - Yun Gan (윤간, 尹旰)
 Wife and children
 Lady Jo of the Pungyang Jo clan (풍양 조씨, 豐壤 趙氏)
 Son - Yun Hwan (윤환, 尹晥) (1556 - ?)
 Daughter-in-law - Lady Lee (이씨)
 Grandson - Yun Eung-ji (윤응지, 尹應之) (1582 - 5 November 1641)
 Son - Yun Jil (윤질, 尹晊)
 Grandson - Yun Taek-ji (윤택지, 尹擇之)
 Grandson - Yun Sang-ji (윤상지, 尹尙之); became the adoptive son of Yun Yu
 Grandson - Yun Yeol-ji (윤열지, 尹悅之)
 Grandson - Yun Joong-ji (윤종지, 尹宗之); became the adoptive son of Yun Min
 Son - Yun Myeong (윤명, 尹㫥)
 Grandson - Yun Jeong-ji (윤정지, 尹挺之)
 Son - Yun Yu (윤유, 尹曘)
 Son - Yun Hwan (윤환, 尹㬇)
 Daughter-in-law - Lady Lee of the Ugye Lee clan (우계 이씨, 羽溪 李氏)
 Grandson - Yun Jing-ji (윤징지, 尹澄之)
 Son - Yun Min (윤민, 尹旼)

Popular culture
 Portrayed by Lee Won-bal in the 2004-2005 KBS1 TV series Immortal Admiral Yi Sun-sin.

References

1537 births
1619 deaths
16th-century Korean writers
17th-century Korean writers
Joseon scholar-officials
16th-century Korean philosophers
Neo-Confucian scholars